Markounda is a sub-prefecture and town in the Ouham Prefecture of the north-western Central African Republic. The sub-prefecture borders with Chad.

History 
On 1 May 2014 Séléka rebels supported by Chadian mercenaries took control of Markounda from Revolution and Justice armed group. On 19 April 2021 Markounda was recaptured by government forces.

References 

Sub-prefectures of the Central African Republic
Populated places in Ouham